Pool Champion is a video game developed by American studio Bitmasters and published by Mindscape for Windows in 1995.

Gameplay
Pool Champion is a game in which the player goes from playing in pool halls to pro tournaments.

Reception
Next Generation reviewed the PC version of the game, rating it one star out of five, and stated that "If you're looking for a graphic adventure, buy an adventure. If you're looking for a pool sim, you're better off checking out Interplay's Virtual Pool."

Reviews
Computer Gaming World (Mar, 1996)
PC Player (Germany) - Feb, 1996
Coming Soon Magazine

References

1995 video games
Mindscape games
Pool video games
Video games developed in the United States
Windows games
Windows-only games